Scott Kenneth McKillop (born March 4, 1986) is a former American football linebacker. He was drafted by the San Francisco 49ers in the fifth round of the 2009 NFL Draft. He played college football at Pittsburgh.

Early years
McKillop attended Kiski Area High School in Allegheny Township, Pennsylvania, where he was a starter for 2½ seasons on both sides of the ball (linebacker and fullback). He totaled 132 tackles his senior season. At fullback McKillop rushed for 1,121 yards and 14 touchdowns over his final two seasons and helped Kiski Area to three consecutive WPIAL Class AAAA playoff berths.

Considered a three-star recruit by Rivals.com, McKillop was listed as the No. 31 outside linebacker prospects in the nation.

College career
After redshirting his initial year at Pittsburgh, McKillop served as the primary backup at middle linebacker behind All-America H. B. Blades, before seizing the starting role in 2007. Still a relatively unknown player as of the beginning of his junior season, McKillop enjoyed one of the most productive seasons ever by a Pitt defender, finishing with 151 total tackles, the third highest single-season total in Pitt history. The centerpiece of a unit that is seventh nationally in total defense, yielding just 297.67 yards per game, McKillop also compiled 9.0 tackles for loss, three sacks, two fumble recoveries, an interception and seven pass breakups.

McKillop built a national reputation in 2008 and was a leading candidate for the country's top defensive awards. He recorded 126 tackles, 16.5 TFLs, four sacks and one interception, and earned 2008 All-American honors by the Football Writers Association of America and CBS Sports.

Professional career

2009 NFL Draft
McKillop was regarded as one of the better linebackers available in the 2009 NFL Draft. He was selected in the fifth round (146th overall) by the San Francisco 49ers.

San Francisco 49ers
An inside linebacker in San Francisco's 3-4 defense, McKillop competed with former veteran player Jeff Ulbrich to serve as backup to Patrick Willis and Takeo Spikes.
Scott McKillop recorded his first interception in a preseason game against the Oakland Raiders. Scott scored his first NFL touchdown on October 4, 2009 against the St. Louis Rams after recovering a botched punt return in the endzone.

McKillop tore his left ACL and patellar tendon during the 2010 training camp. He was waived by the 49ers on August 30, 2011.

References

External links
49ers bio
Pittsburgh bio

1986 births
Living people
American football linebackers
Buffalo Bills players
People from Westmoreland County, Pennsylvania
Pittsburgh Panthers football players
Players of American football from Pennsylvania
San Francisco 49ers players
Sportspeople from the Pittsburgh metropolitan area